Syrastrena is a genus of moths in the family Lasiocampidae. The genus was erected by Moore in 1884.

Species
Syrastrena lajonquieri Holloway, 1982
Syrastrena lanaoensis Tams, 1935
Syrastrena malaccana Tams, 1935
Syrastrena minor Moore, 1879
Syrastrena sumatrana Tams, 1935
Syrastrena tamsi Holloway, 1982

References

Lasiocampidae